Staplewood Campus in Marchwood, Hampshire is the training ground of Southampton Football Club.

History and development

The site which would later become known as Staplewood, started out life as Road-Sea Park. Back in the 1980s, Peter Price manager/owner of former Southern League club Road-Sea Southampton purchased some land in Marchwood, and with the aid of corporate financial backing saw the facilities develop.

Redevelopment

Facilities

The Staplewood Football Development & Support Centre is equipped with a sports science, scouting & recruitment, football administration and medical departments, as well as training, changing and dining facilities.

References

External links

 Staplewood Campus at AFL Architects

Staplewood
Southampton F.C.